String Theory: Cohesion is a 2005 novel by American author Jeffrey Lang, the first book of the Star Trek: Voyager series, a sci-fi series set in the Star Trek universe. It was released to commemorate the 10th anniversary of the television series Star Trek: Voyager and takes place between the 4th and 5th seasons.

It was published by Simon & Schuster, and has 384 pages.

Story 
At the end of year 2374, not long after the encounter with Arthuris and the fake USS Dauntless (episode "Hope and fear"), a crew of starship Voyager finds a strange planetary system, which, by the known laws of physics, should not exist. After a quick scan through the system they almost bump into another spaceship, which's occupants, from the species of Monorhs, appear to come from one of the planet. They are escaping in hope that they will get to a new planet, because their own planet is dying. Voyager takes their monumental, although compared to the Federation technology a very outdated ship into a tow beam, but in the attempt to export them out of the system, their ship is destroyed. The structure of space itself in the monorhian system is interesting - it is not possible to create a stable warp field, so warp is practically impossible to achieve here. The whole space and subspace structure looks like someone tried to cover "space holes" with it.

A few of the survivor Monohrs are taken onboard Voyager are taken by captain Kathryn Janeway back on the planet, so she can explain to the highest Monorhian representatives about what happened, and to offer help. The crew discovers that life on Monorha is dying because of the uncommon radiation coming from the white dwarf, which together with three other planets is orbiting a standard star. Monorhs are living inside cities covered with shields, which are unfortunately not very effective. Capitan Janeway decides to send B'Elanna Torres and Seven of Nine, which should help them improve these shield. During a mysterious blast from the surface of the planet, the shuttlecraft crashes and Torres a Seven find a desert complex, where scientists were attempting to improve the shields and the said blast was an unwanted byeffect of their work. They discover together, that Voyager was sent in between two spatial layers by the blast, to a kind of subspace capsule, where is the radiation from the white dwarf, The Blue eye, even more concentrated. With the use of modified torpedoes, which they later fire into the dwarf, the starship gets back to normal space, but the star is shrunk to a microsingularity.

B'Elanna, together with Seventh and with Kaytok, one of the monorhian scientists, come back to Voyager, where Kaytok has a hallucination with his grandfather, after which he hands the Key from Gremadia, a saint relic of Monohrs, to Janeway. Wounded lieutenant Tuvok disappears from the ship, and the records show that he flew out in a shuttlecraft without a permission two hours ago.

The story continues with the novel Fusion.

See also
List of Star Trek: Voyager novels

References 

Novels based on Star Trek: Voyager